The Xishancun Formation is a geological formation located at Qujing, Yunnan, South China. Xishancun Formation has remains of petalichthyid and galeaspid fish and it represents the Early Devonian period (Early Lochkovian) of China.

See also 
 List of fossil sites (with link directory)

Geologic formations of China
Devonian System of Asia
Devonian China
Devonian northern paleotropical deposits
Paleontology in Yunnan